The 1970 Vermont Catamounts football team was an American football team that represented  the University of Vermont in the Yankee Conference during the 1970 NCAA College Division football season. In their first year under head coach Joe Scannella, the team compiled an 0–9 record.

Schedule

References

Vermont
Vermont Catamounts football seasons
College football winless seasons
Vermont Catamounts football